La leggenda di Sakùntala (titled Sakùntala in its revised version) is a three-act opera by Franco Alfano, who wrote his own libretto, basing his work on Kālidāsa's 5th-century BC drama Shakuntala.

Première, loss, reconstruction, rediscovery
It was first performed at the Teatro Comunale di Bologna on 10 December 1921. The full score and orchestral materials were believed to have been destroyed when an Allied bomb damaged the archives of Alfano's publisher Ricordi during World War II, so Alfano reconstructed the opera and it was performed at the Teatro dell'Opera in Rome on 5 January 1952 with the shortened title of Sakùntala. During preparations for a revival in Rome in April 2006, a copy of the original 1921 score was discovered in the Ricordi archives, and the opera was performed for the first time in its original form in modern times under its original name, La leggenda di Sakùntala. Critically regarded as Alfano's best work, though seldom staged in recent years, the opera was performed seven times for Italian radio between its premiere and 1979. These broadcasts featured such sopranos as Magda Olivero, Anna de Cavalieri, and Celestina Casapietra in the title role. The opera was also revived at the Wexford Opera Festival in 1982, and in concert on November 19, 2013, by Teatro Grattacielo in New York.

Roles

Synopsis

Act 1
The King encounters Sakùntala while hunting with his men near the remote woodland monastery where she lives. The King woos her, and overcoming her initial fear, promises that he will return, giving her a ring by which to remember him.

Act 2
Daydreaming about the King, Sakùntala fails to hear the hermit Durvasas's entreaties to open the monastery's gate to admit him.  Angered, he curses Sakùntala, proclaiming that the King would not remember her.  Sakùntala begs a cloud to carry a message to the King.  Harita returns to the monastery, and tells Sakùntala that she is with child.

Act 3
The King is restless, and not entertained by the dancing girls who perform for him.  Sakùntala arrives with her entourage, but when she attempts to present her ring of remembrance to the King, she realizes that she has lost it.  The curse is fulfilled, and Sakùntala rushes out of the palace to drown herself in a lake.  However, belatedly, a fisherman arrives, having found the ring, and presents it to the King, who suddenly remembers Sakùntala.  Servants enter, bearing Sakùntala's infant child, and the King cries out in anguish.  But Sakùntala's voice descends from heaven (having been taken up into the heavens by a cloud of fire), and tells the King not to despair, for their child will become the hero of the future age.  All the people kneel and worship the infant.

References
Notes

Sources

Jürgen Maehder (1992), Sakùntala in The New Grove Dictionary of Opera, ed. Stanley Sadie (London)

External links
 Synopsis
 Libretto in Italian and English
 

Operas by Franco Alfano
Italian-language operas
Verismo operas
Operas
1921 operas
1952 operas
Operas set in India
Operas set in antiquity
Operas based on plays
Works based on Shakuntala (play)